"I Love the Way You Love Me" is a song recorded by American country music singer John Michael Montgomery from his debut album, Life's a Dance (1992). It was written by Victoria Shaw and Chuck Cannon, and released in March 1993 as the album's second single. The song reached the top of the US Billboard Hot Country Singles & Tracks chart. It became Montgomery's first number-one single and was named Song of the Year by the Academy of Country Music.

Music video
The music video was directed by Marc Ball and premiered in early 1993.

Charts

Weekly charts

Year-end charts

Boyzone version

"I Love the Way You Love Me" was covered by the Irish boyband Boyzone. It was released on November 23, 1998, as the fifth single from their third album, Where We Belong (1998). The song has received a gold certification in the UK, where it charted at number two, and in New Zealand, where it topped the RIANZ Singles Chart for two weeks. "I Love the Way You Love Me" was re-produced by Steve Mac for its single release, with the album version being produced by Rose & Foster.

Track listings
UK CD1
 "I Love the Way You Love Me" 
 "Waiting for You" 
 "Let the Message Run Free" 

UK CD2
 "I Love the Way You Love Me" 
 "Grease Medley" (live from Wembley) 
 "No Matter What" (live from Wembley) 

UK cassette single
 "I Love the Way You Love Me" 
 "Waiting for You"

Personnel
Personnel are lifted from the By Request album booklet.
 Victoria Shaw – writing
 Chuck Cannon – writing
 Paul Gendler – acoustic guitars
 Frizzy Karlsson – electric guitars
 Steve Mac – piano, production, mixing
 Chris Laws – drums, engineering
 Richard Niles – string arrangement
 Robin Sellars – mix engineering

Charts

Weekly charts

Year-end charts

Certifications

References

1992 songs
1993 singles
1998 singles
Atlantic Records singles
Boyzone songs
John Michael Montgomery songs
Number-one singles in New Zealand
Polydor Records singles
Song recordings produced by David Foster
Song recordings produced by Doug Johnson (record producer)
Songs written by Chuck Cannon
Songs written by Victoria Shaw (singer)